RCR Arquitectes is a Spanish architecture firm consisting of principles and co-founders Rafael Aranda, Carme Pigem and Ramon Vilalta. The trio were the 2017 recipients of the Pritzker Prize for Architecture. While the firm had won many awards before the Pritzker, they were relatively unknown compared to other finalists.

History
The firm was founded in Olot, Spain in 1988.

Style
The firm is known for its frequent use of weathering steel in its projects.

Selected projects
The firm designed the imposing  in Rodez, France, after winning a 2007 competition.
 De Krook, the central public library and media center in Ghent, Belgium, designed in collaboration with local firm Coussée & Goris and opened in 2017.
 Celler Peralada, the first winery in Europe to receive the golden LEED certificate for Leadership in Energy and Environmental Design.

References

Pritzker Architecture Prize winners
Companies based in Catalonia
Architecture firms of Spain